Mustafa Kaplan (born 2 September 1967) is a Turkish football manager and former player.

Career
Kaplan had a middling career in Turkey, from 1990 to 1998. He then went into management as assistant manager at Ankaragücü in 2003. In 2006, he was named the assistant manager at Gençlerbirliği. After a couple more stints as assistant manager, he was named the first team manager of Ankaragücü in 2012. He spent most of his career as manager between Ankaragücü and Gençlerbirliği, and Hacettepe. He most recently had a stints as manager at Gençlerbirliği from 2020 to 31 January 2021.

References

External links
 
 TFF Manager Profile
 
 Mackolik Manager Profile

1967 births
Living people
People from Kırşehir
Turkish footballers
Turkish football managers
Kırşehirspor footballers
Alanyaspor footballers
Süper Lig players
TFF First League players
TFF Second League players
MKE Ankaragücü managers
Gençlerbirliği S.K. managers
Adanaspor managers
Süper Lig managers
Association football forwards